Yancy may refer to:

Given name:
Yancy (musician) (born 1980), American Christian musician
Yancy Ayers (1891–1968), American pitcher in Major League Baseball
William Yancy Bell (1887–1962), follower of Marcus Garvey, Bishop of the Christian Methodist Episcopal Church
Yancy Butler (born 1970), American television and movie actress
James Yancy Callahan (1852–1935), late 19th century politician
Ana Yancy Clavel (born 1992), model and beauty queen from El Salvador, Nuestra Belleza El Salvador 2012
Yancy de Ocampo (born 1980), Filipino professional basketball player
Yancy Gates (born 1989), basketball player for Ironi Nahariya of the Israeli Premier League
Yancy Medeiros, American mixed martial artist from Wai'anae, Hawaii
Yancy Spencer III (1950–2011), surfer from Pensacola, Florida
Yancy Thigpen (born 1969), former professional American football wide receiver
Christopher Yancy Thomas (1818–1879), politician and lawyer from Virginia
Adolph Blaine Charles David Earl Frederick Gerald Hubert Irvin John Kenneth Lloyd Martin Nero Oliver Paul Quincy Randolph Sherman Thomas Uncas Victor William Xerxes Yancy Zeus Wolfeschlegelsteinhausenbergerdorff, Senior, Philadelphian typesetter who has the longest personal name ever used

Surname:
Allen Yancy (1881–1941), Vice President of Liberia from 1928 to 1930 under President Charles D.B. King
Barbara Yancy (1934–1996), American politician
George Yancy (born 1961), American philosopher
Hugh Yancy (born 1949), American former professional baseball player

Fiction:
The Mold of Yancy, science fiction short story by Philip K. Dick, first published in 1955
Yancy Academy, school setting of the first Percy Jackson book, The Lightning Thief, by Rick Riordan
Yancy Derringer, American Western series that ran on CBS from 1958 to 1959
Yancy Street Gang, fictional street gang in the Fantastic Four comic book published by Marvel Comics
Yancy, a character in Pokémon Black 2 and White 2
Yancy Fry, brother of Philip J. Fry in American animated science fiction sitcom Futurama
Yancy Tucker, a secondary character on The Waltons

Typhoons:
Typhoon Yancy (Gading) (1990)
Typhoon Yancy (Tasing) (1993)

See also
Yancey (disambiguation)
Ayancık
Ancey
Ancy